Thilo Leugers (born 9 January 1991) is a German former professional footballer who played as a midfielder.

Career
In May 2022 Leugers announced his retirement from playing due to recurring injury problems. In his last game for SV Meppen against Eintracht Braunschweig he was part of the starting eleven just to have an emotional goodbye to his fans in the stands before he was supposed to be substituted early in the game. As it happens, he of all people scored the first goal in an eventual 3-2 win before he left the game in the seventh minute under standing ovations by the Meppen fans.

Honours
Twente
Johan Cruijff Schaal: 2011

References

External links
 
 Voetbal International profile 
 

1991 births
Living people
People from Lingen
Footballers from Lower Saxony
German footballers
Association football midfielders
Eredivisie players
Eerste Divisie players
Segunda División B players
3. Liga players
FC Twente players
NAC Breda players
CD Atlético Baleares footballers
SV Meppen players
German expatriate footballers
German expatriate sportspeople in the Netherlands
Expatriate footballers in the Netherlands
German expatriate sportspeople in Spain
Expatriate footballers in Spain
Jong FC Twente players